Money From Home is a 1953 American comedy film starring Dean Martin and Jerry Lewis.  The comedy was the first for the Martin and Lewis team to be shot in color and was their only film in 3-D.  The picture was premiered as a special preview screening across the U.S. on New Year's Eve, 1953.

Plot
New York City in the 1920s is where gambler "Honey Talk" Nelson crosses paths with bookie "Jumbo" Schneider.  Nelson has two choices, cement shoes or "fixing" a horse race in Maryland.  Naturally, Nelson heads to Maryland with his cousin Virgil Yokum tagging along.

Once in Maryland, Nelson falls for the owner of the horse that has been chosen for the "fix".  Virgil has also fallen in love, with the horse's veterinarian.

Nelson decides that love should prevail and refuses to go along with the plan.  Meanwhile, an English jockey, who is to ride the horse, is prevented from performing his job by Schneider's mobsters and Yokum winds up riding the horse to victory.

Cast
Dean Martin as Herman "Honey Talk" Nelson
Jerry Lewis as Virgil Yokum
Marjie Millar as Phyllis Leigh
Patricia "Pat" Crowley as Dr. Autumn Claypool
Richard Haydn as Bertie Searles
Robert Strauss as Seldom Seen Kid
Gerald Mohr as Marshall Preston
Sheldon Leonard as Jumbo Schneider
Romo Vincent as The Poojah
Jack Kruschen as Short Boy
Charles Horvath as Big Midge (billed as Charles Frank Horvath)
Richard Reeves as Russian Henry (billed as Richard J. Reeves)
Lou Lubin as Sam
Frank Richards as Angry Truck Driver
Harry Hayden as First Race Judge

Production
The team's eleventh feature, Money from Home was the first Martin and Lewis film made in color, although they did make a color, cameo appearance in the 1952 Bob Hope and Bing Crosby film, Road to Bali.  It was filmed from March 9 to May 1, 1953.

Money From Home is also the only Martin and Lewis film made in 3-D, having been shot with Technicolor's 3-D camera rig, which exposed six strips of film in synchronization.  It was the second and final time the rig was used.  The film was also the third and last time one of the team's features was available with a Western Electric, 3-track stereophonic soundtrack.  This soundtrack is now lost.

The film was premiered on New Year's Eve, 1953 as a special preview in 322 theaters.  Because of a technical issue at Technicolor, pairs of prints necessary for 3-D were not available, so the film was previewed in 2-D.  The film went into general release in February, 1954.

Lewis received an additional on-screen credit: "Special Material in Song Numbers Staged by Jerry Lewis."  It was the only time during the team's productions that Lewis received creative credit, despite co-writing and co-directing several of the pictures.

Home media
After being excluded from both Paramount Pictures Martin and Lewis DVD collections, released in 2006 and 2007, Money from Home saw a single-disc DVD release on July 1, 2008 and a blu-ray release on June 27, 2017.

References

External links 
 
 
 

1953 films
1953 comedy films
1953 3D films
American comedy films
American 3D films
1950s English-language films
Films scored by Leigh Harline
Films directed by George Marshall
Films produced by Hal B. Wallis
Films set in the 1920s
Films about gambling
American horse racing films
Paramount Pictures films
1950s American films